Jon W. Thompson (1954 – July 22, 2019) was a Judge of the Arizona Court of Appeals from 1995 until his death in 2019.

Early life and education
Thompson attended Glendale Community College before earning a bachelor's degree from Northern Arizona University in 1975 and received his Juris Doctor from the University of Colorado in 1979.

Legal career
Thompson was a deputy county attorney in Coconino and Yuma counties. He then served as a judge pro tempore for the Coconino County Superior Court and worked in private practice in Flagstaff.

Appointment to state court of appeals
Thompson was appointed to the court by Governor Fife Symington in 1995. He was retained by voters in 1998, 2004, 2010, and 2016. At the time of his death, Thompson was the state's second-longest serving appellate judge.

In 2018, Thompson authored a decision that rendered cannabis extracts like hash oil illegal, the state supreme court eventually reversed.

References

External links
Biography on Arizona Judicial Branch website archived from the original

1954 births
21st-century American judges
Arizona lawyers
Northern Arizona University alumni
2019 deaths
Arizona state court judges
University of Colorado alumni
20th-century American judges
20th-century American lawyers